James (Philosopher) Smith (1 July 1827 – 15 June 1897) was a politician, goldminer, explorer and discoverer of tin reserves in Tasmania, Australia including the Mount Bischoff mine.

Smith was born at Georgetown, Van Diemen's Land (now Tasmania), second of three children of John Smith and his wife Ann, née Grant. When James Smith was five years old, his father was shot dead and his mother later remarried. Smith was educated at Launceston, and after working for some time managing a flour-mill there,  he went to the Victorian gold diggings in 1852. Returning in 1853 Smith took up one square mile (2.6 km²) of forested land at Westwood between the Forth River and Leven River. After making this his headquarters Smith began exploring and prospecting. There was barren and mountainous country to the south of his home, and Smith had to endure many privations. He discovered gold on the Forth River, copper on the west side of the Leven River, and silver and iron ore at Penguin.

On 4 December 1871 Smith discovered a large deposit of tin oxide near the summit of Mount Bischoff. His specimens when smelted yielded the first tin found in Tasmania, but it took some time for the importance of the find to be realised. In August 1872 Smith took a small party with him to the field and in 1873 several tons of ore were sent to Melbourne. In that year the mine was visited by William Ritchie, a solicitor at Launceston, and with his help the 'Mount Bischoff Tin-mining Company' was floated with 12,000 shares of £5 each. Of these 4400 were reserved for Smith who also received £1500 in cash. One expert who visited the mine at this time pronounced it to be the richest tin-mine in the world. The company, however, had many difficulties, one being that the bush track to the coast for many months of the year was almost impassable.

Eventually a tramway was constructed, the mine became extremely successful, much employment resulted, and an enormous sum was paid in dividends. In February 1878 Smith was publicly presented with a silver salver and a purse of 250 sovereigns; the Tasmanian parliament voted him a pension of £200 a year. The address which accompanied the gifts stated that as a result of his discovery commerce had developed, property had increased in value, and all classes of the community had been benefited. In 1886, he was elected to the Tasmanian Legislative Council but he resigned his seat in 1888. Smith, who was an excellent assayer and a close student of geology, continued his prospecting for the remainder of his life.

Smith died at Launceston of heart disease on 15 June 1897 leaving a widow, three sons and three daughters. A quiet, somewhat reserved man, benevolent and charitable, Smith was a natural explorer of much determination, who was not daunted by hardship. His work was of the greatest use to Tasmania not only for its own sake, but for the encouragement it gave to others who made further discoveries.

References

Further reading
Binks, C.J. (1980) Explorers of Western Tasmania, Launceston, Mary Fisher Bookshop.  (198-202 - The Mountain of Tin:James Smith)
Haygarth, Nic (2004) Baron Bischoff - Philosopher Smith and the Birth of Tasmanian Mining 

1827 births
1897 deaths
Australian explorers
Members of the Tasmanian Legislative Council
19th-century Australian politicians